Alenka Zupančič (born 1 April 1966) is a Slovenian philosopher whose work focuses on psychoanalysis and continental philosophy.
She is a Slovenian psychoanalytic theorist and philosopher who along with Mladen Dolar and Slavoj Žižek have in large measure been responsible for the popularity in North America (and Europe) of a politically infused Lacanian psychoanalysis.

Academics and work 
Born in Ljubljana, Zupančič graduated from the University of Ljubljana in 1990 and received her doctorate in 1995 with a dissertation titled Dejanje in zakon, nezavedno in pojem. Zupančič went on to receive a second doctorate from the Université Paris VIII under Alain Badiou in 1997. She is currently a full-time researcher at the Institute of Philosophy of the Slovenian Academy of Sciences and Arts and a visiting professor at the European Graduate School. Zupančič belongs to the Ljubljana School of Psychoanalysis, which is known for its predominantly Lacanian foundations. Her philosophy is strongly influenced by Slovenian Lacanian scholars, especially Mladen Dolar and Slavoj Žižek.

Zupančič has written on several topics including ethics, literature, comedy, and love. She is most renowned as a Nietzsche scholar, but Immanuel Kant, Georg Wilhelm Friedrich Hegel, Henri Bergson and Alain Badiou are also referenced in her work. She has many videos on YouTube where she talks about her work and the topics. She has also a Facebook page. There are videos of her and her lectures on the European Graduate School website.

She has 242 works in 305 publications in 6 languages and 3,558 library holdings.

Bibliography
 Alenka Zupančič EGS Faculty Page (Biography & Works).

References

External links
 Alenka Zupančič Faculty page at European Graduate School. Biography and bibliography.
 Alenka Zupančič Profile at the Slovenian Academy of Sciences and Arts. Biography and bibliography.
 Steven Michels. 'Nietzsche, Interrupted: A review of Alenka Zupancic, The Shortest Shadow: Nietzsche's Philosophy of the Two'. In: Lacan.com.
 Adam Atkinson. The Odd One In: On Comedy by Alenka Zupančič. In: Media Culture Reviews.

1966 births
Living people
University of Ljubljana alumni
Academic staff of the University of Ljubljana
Academic staff of European Graduate School
Slovenian women philosophers
Slovenian expatriates in Switzerland
Continental philosophers
21st-century Slovenian philosophers